Associação Desportiva do Bairro Craveiro Lopes, simply known as AD Bairro or ADESBA for short, is a basketball club based in the neighborhood of Craveiro Lopes, just west of the center of Praia on the island of Santiago, Cape Verde. The team is a member of the Santiago South Regional Basketball Association. 

It is one of four sporting departments of ADESBA.  The club won three national championship titles. Its current president is Carlos Sena Teixeira and the nickname is Canarinha, which is Portuguese for the little canary.

History
The basketball team was founded in 1975 when the country was becoming independent and was Bairro's second sports department.  It was one of the first Cape Verdean basketball teams.

AD Bairro (Craveiro Lopes) won their national competition title in the 2015 season and was the first basketball club to compete in the African competitions and finished eight in the 2015 FIBA Africa Clubs Champions Cup. AD Bairro was the next club to compete in the African competitions in any sport, the last appearance was Sporting Clube da Praia in soccer in 2009.

Logo and uniform
Its logo color has a green seal with ADESBA on top and the club's full name on the bottom with the football (soccer ball) and basketball in the middle, the sports that Bairro have.

AD Bairro's basketball team's uniform has nearly the same colors to the football (soccer) club.

Arena

The team plays at Gimnodesportivo Vava Duarte in Gamboa, Praia just south of Estádio da Várzea and the city center. Teams based in the city that play in the arena are ABC and Seven Stars. All other teams based in a subdivision in Praia or the south of the island play at the arena.

Honours
Santiago South Basketball Championships: 2 listed
2011-12, 2014-15

Cape Verdean Basketball Championships: 3, 2 listed
2012, 2015

Championship and cup history

Island/Regional championship

Statistics
Best position: 8th (continental)

Notable former players

 Ivan Almeida (in 2010–11, 2012 and 2013)
 Joel Almeida (in 2011)
 Fidel Mendonça (in 2013–18)

See also
AD Bairro

References

External links
Official website which includes basketball 
AD Bairro at League Line-Up
AD Bairro at Sports Mídia 

 
Basketball teams in Cape Verde
Sport in Praia
1975 establishments in Cape Verde
Basketball teams established in 1975